Wadia (Wadih) Sabra (23 February 1876 – 11 April 1952) was a Lebanese composer and founder of the Conservatoire Libanais.

Life
Wadia (Wadih) Sabra was born in 1876 in the village of Ain el Jdideh and died in Beirut in 1952. He married Adèle Misk in 1921 and had no children. He was buried in the Evangelical Cemetery in Sodeco Beirut.

As a composer, his music is characterized as a blend of Western and Eastern musical languages, incorporating the strengths and charms of both traditions. He is best known today as the composer of the Lebanese National Anthem, popularly known as Kulluna lil Watan (words by Rashid Nakhle), which was officially adopted by the Lebanese Government through a presidential decree on 12 July 1927.

He is considered the founding father of classical music in Lebanon.

After studying at the American University of Beirut, he left for Paris in 1892, with a scholarship from the French Embassy to study at the Conservatoire de Paris. He stayed for 7 years where he studied with the musicologist Albert Lavignac. He took a job as the principal organist of the Evangelical Church of the Holy Spirit. He then returned to Beirut, where he founded, in 1910, the first School of Music (Dar ul Musica). Despite having a great interest in the study of Western disciplines, Sabra was, during his first stay in Paris, the initiator of a new style in oriental music, particularly Lebanese. His conspicuous taste for research made him return to Paris, where he worked with the Pleyel studios to develop a "new unit of measurement", the "universal range", which he was going to present to the specialists in music during a Congress planned in Beirut, had he not died on the 11th of April 1952.

Sabra, the founder-administrator of "Dar ul Musica" saw his School become "national" on 31 October 1925, which, in 1929, also grew to become the "National Conservatory ", which he was called to direct. Not only does his legacy include a keyboard with quarter-tone intervals, but also work on "Arab music, basis of Western art", as well as a certain number of various works, including the Lebanese National Anthem. The National School of Music has been endowed with a Monthly Review, a permanent link between this Institution, its students, and the first music lovers of Lebanon.

Sabra was "in ruins" after spending all his money on his work; hence, after many unsuccessful requests of grants and retirement pension to the Lebanese government, his wife, Adèle Misk, went to live with her nephew Dr. Robert Misk. Moreover, the atmosphere between Adèle and their adoptive daughter Badiha Ashkar had arrived to a point of no return, she decided to hide all her husband's works in a blue metal trunk box that the family called "La Malle Bleue", where they remained until 2016, when the Misk family gave it to the CPML for safekeeping.

Because of these archives, Zeina Saleh Kayali was able to write a biography on Wadia Sabra in 2018 in the collection "Figures musicales du Liban" (Musical Figures of Lebanon).

in 2021, the baritone Fady Jeanbart published 2 books of scores of Sabra's works:

 Les Bergers de Canaan & L'Émigré (extraits) (ISBN 978-9953-0-5443-8)
 20 pièces pour piano (ISBN 978-9953-0-5442-1)

Sabra had an oriental piano manufactured by Pleyel in Paris in 1920.

On the initiative of the "Friend of the Cedars Forest Committee-Bsharry" as well as baritone Fady Jeanbart, a cedar was baptized in the name of Wadia Sabra in the new reserve of the Cedars of God forest in northern Lebanon on Sunday October 2, 2022.

It bears the number: Z10-2066/6477

Selected works

Operas
Les Bergers de Canaan, (The Shepards of Canaan) biblique opera in Turkish, libretto by Halide Edib Hanoum, 1917, French version by  Mrs J.Ph de Barjeau
Les Deux Rois, (The Two Kings) 1st opera in Arabic, libretto by father Maroun Ghosn, 1928
L'Émigré, (The Emigrant) French operetta, libretto by Robert Chamboulan, 1931

Oratorio
Les Voix de Noël, Oratorio pour solistes (Baryton, Mezzo, ténor et choeur), paroles d'Auguste Fisch 1896
Nous prêchons ton amour, cantique religieux pour solo (Mezzo ou Baryton) et choeur, 1896
Venez à moi, cantique religieux pour solo (Mezzo ou Baryton)et choeur, 1896
La gloire du Liban, cantique pour solo et choeur, paroles du père Maroun Ghosn (1880–1940)

Melodies
Quoi? tout est fini?, Arabic lyrics by Saïd Akl
Souvenir d'une mère, Arabic lyrics by Shibli Mallat (1876–1961)
Notre mère la Terre, Arabic lyrics by Rushdi Ma'louf (1915–1980)
Me voilà Liban, pour soliste et choeur, Arabic lyrics.
Voici le matin, Arabic lyrics by Gibran Khalil Gibran.
Le desert, pour soliste et choeur, Arabic lyrics
Ya Misrou, Chant Patriotique en l'honneur du héros national Saad Zaghloul Pacha, Arabic lyrics by d'Alexandra d'Avierino
L'Hymne de la Gaule, French lyrics by E.Creissel

Piano
Valse de Concert (1906)
Valse Caprice (1933)
Valse Orientale
La Rozana, 12 variations sur l'air populaire (1913)
El Dabké, le véritable quadrille orientale
Gavotte en ré mineur
Hawed min hona, 12 variations (1924)
 Several untitled pieces, essentially dances & marches
Recueil d'airs Orientaux : (1906-1909)
 Ahwal - Ghazal
 Ouaskinir - Rah
 Kaddoulal - Mayyass
 Raieh - feine
 Antal  - Moumannah
 Marche Orientale
 Kom Ouastameh
 Ya Ghazâli
 Padishahem
 Al Djazayer
 Polka Orientale
 Ya Safal - Azman
 Binteche - Chalabyya
 Oumi Tkaddari
 Tafta Hindi
 Madad Madad
 La Constitutionnelle
 Hymne Constitutionnel
 2e Marche Orientale
 3e Marche Orientale

Decorations
 Academic palms, officer rank (France)
 Medal of Officer of the Order of Public Instruction (France)
 Lebanese Silver Merit Medal: 05-22-1935 (decree n ° 1853)
 Knight of the Legion of Honor (France)
Lebanese Gold Merit Medal : 12-04-1952 (decree no 299)

Notes

References
 References

 Works Cited
 https://data.bnf.fr/fr/16420920/wadia_sabra/
 Zeina Saleh Kayali "Figures musicales du Liban" aux éditions Geuthner
 'OperaGlass' page (cached)
 http://portal.gov.lb/index.html
 Les Bergers de Canaan & L'Émigré (extraits) (ISBN 978-9953-0-5443-8), édition Fady Jeanbart
 20 pièces pour piano (ISBN 978-9953-0-5442-1), édition Fady Jeanbart

External links
 CMPL

Lebanese composers
Lebanese Christians
Lebanese classical composers
Lebanese opera composers
Lebanese Protestant hymnwriters
1876 births
1952 deaths
National anthem writers
Musicians from Beirut
Academic staff of Conservatoire Libanais